The Conquest of Shu by Wei was a military campaign launched by the dynastic state of Cao Wei against its rival Shu Han in late 263 during the Three Kingdoms period of China. The campaign culminated in the fall of Shu Han and the tripartite equilibrium maintained in China for over 40 years since the end of the Eastern Han dynasty in 220. The conquest laid the foundation for an eventual reunified China under the Western Jin dynasty in 280.

Background

Following the end of the Eastern Han dynasty in 220, three contending states emerged in China and fought for control over the territories of the former Han Empire. Among the three, Wei was the most powerful one in terms of military prowess, economic resources, manpower and geographical size. The other two, Shu and Wu, re-established their alliance against Wei in 223.

Between 228 and 234, the Shu regent Zhuge Liang, who advocated an aggressive foreign policy towards Wei, launched a series of five military campaigns (known as the "Northern Expeditions") to attack Wei territories in Yong and Liang provinces (covering parts of present-day Gansu and Shaanxi). The ultimate goal of the campaigns was to clear the path for Shu forces to capture the Wei capital, Luoyang, and restore the Han dynasty. All the campaigns turned out unsuccessful. After Zhuge Liang died in 234, his successors Jiang Wan and Fei Yi adopted a more defensive stance against Wei and focused on policies promoting internal development and stability in Shu. However, between 240 and 262, the Shu general Jiang Wei followed up on Zhuge Liang's legacy by launching another 11 military campaigns against Wei. However, each campaign was ultimately aborted due to inadequate food supplies, heavy losses on the battlefield, or other reasons. The campaigns not only severely depleted Shu's already limited resources and took a heavy toll on Shu's population, but also resulted in much public resentment against Jiang Wei.

In the meantime, the Wei general Sima Yi came to power after staging a successful coup d'état in 249. After his death in 251, his eldest son Sima Shi succeeded him as regent and consolidated power and control over the Wei government. In 254, Sima Shi deposed the Wei emperor Cao Fang, who tried to seize back power from him, and installed Cao Mao on the throne. Following Sima Shi's death in 255, his younger brother Sima Zhao became the new regent and continued to monopolise power in Wei. In 260, Cao Mao attempted to launch a coup d'état to overthrow Sima Zhao but failed and lost his life. Cao Huan, who succeeded Cao Mao as the Wei emperor, remained a puppet ruler under Sima Zhao's influence and control.

Wei strategic planning

Wei decision to attack Shu
In 262, Sima Zhao noted that Shu was growing weak and lacking in resources after constantly waging war against Wei, so he wanted to launch a large-scale invasion of Shu to eliminate the threat of Shu. Among those he consulted, only Zhong Hui agreed that Wei was capable of conquering Shu. Zhong Hui then assisted Sima Zhao in formulating a strategy for the conquest of Shu.

Sima Zhao made an announcement to the Wei imperial court as follows: 

The Wei general Deng Ai, who had been leading Wei forces to resist multiple Shu incursions along the Wei–Shu border since 255, voiced strong objections to the campaign against Shu. Sima Zhao worried that Deng Ai would embolden others to oppose the campaign as well, so he commissioned his registrar Shi Zuan (師纂) as a major under Deng Ai and ordered him to "persuade" Deng Ai. Deng Ai then changed his mind and supported the campaign.

Wei's three-pronged invasion of Shu
In the winter of 262, Sima Zhao appointed Zhong Hui as General Who Guards the West (鎮西將軍) and granted him imperial authority to oversee military affairs in the Guanzhong region. The Wei government also mobilised about 180,000 troops from the various provinces throughout Wei in preparation for the invasion of Shu. At the same time, the Wei government also put Tang Zi in charge of overseeing the construction of warships in preparation for a future invasion of Wei's other rival state, Wu.

In the autumn of 263, the Wei imperial court issued an edict outlining a three-pronged invasion of Shu:
 Deng Ai would lead 30,000 troops through Gansong (甘松; southeast of present-day Têwo County, Gansu) to attack Jiang Wei's position at Tazhong (沓中; northwest of present-day Zhugqu County, Gansu);
 Zhuge Xu would lead 30,000 troops to Wujie Bridge (武街橋; northwest of present-day Wen County, Gansu) to block Jiang Wei's retreat route;
 Zhong Hui would lead more than 100,000 troops to attack Shu via the Xie Valley (斜谷; southwest of present-day Mei County, Shaanxi);
 Zhong Hui's subordinates, Li Fu (李輔) and Hu Lie, would lead a detachment through the Luo Valley (駱谷; southwest of present-day Zhouzhi County, Shaanxi).
 The Wei imperial court authorised Wei Guan to supervise Zhong Hui and Deng Ai's military operations. Wei Guan also held the appointment of an acting military judge under Zhong Hui, and had command of 1,000 troops.

Shu strategic planning

Changes in the Shu defences at Hanzhong
Previously, when the Shu general Wei Yan first took charge of guarding Hanzhong Commandery in 219, he borrowed the concept of "double gates" from the Yijing and deployed heavily armed troops at interlocking camps on the outskirts and exits of trails leading into Hanzhong. These camps were meant to obstruct and hold off any invading forces. During the Battle of Xingshi in 244, the Shu general Wang Ping used the same strategy to defend Hanzhong from a Wei invasion led by Cao Shuang.

Jiang Wei pointed out that Wei Yan's idea of the interlocking camps was useful for only defence and would not provide additional advantages. He proposed vacating the camps and moving all their troops and resources to the two fortresses of Hancheng (漢城; east of present-day Mian County, Shaanxi) and Lecheng (樂城; east of present-day Chenggu County, Shaanxi), which provided access the Hanzhong Plain. The idea was to lure the invaders to attack the fortresses, overstretch their supply lines, and wear them down through guerrilla-style attacks. Once the invaders decided to retreat, the defenders would seize the opportunity to launch an all-out counterattack and defeat them.

In 258, Jiang Wei ordered Hu Ji, Jiang Bin and Wang Han (王含), who oversaw Hanzhong's defences, to dismantle the interlocking camps and move their troops and resources to Hanshou (漢壽; northeast of present-day Jiange County, Sichuan), Hancheng and Lecheng respectively. He also ordered the defence infrastructure to be strengthened at a number of locations around Hanzhong: Xi'an (西安), Jianwei (建威), Wuwei (武衛), Shimen (石門), Wucheng (武城), Jianchang (建昌) and Linyuan (臨遠).

Jiang Wei's early warning
In early 263, Jiang Wei wrote a memorial to the Shu emperor Liu Shan as follows: 

The eunuch Huang Hao, whom Liu Shan trusted, believed fortune-tellers' prediction that Wei would not invade Shu, so he advised the emperor to ignore Jiang Wei's memorial and not put it up for discussion in the imperial court.

Prelude
Between 20 September and 19 October 263, the Wei troops mobilised for the campaign had gathered in the Wei capital Luoyang and were ready to depart. Before they left, the Wei government gave out promotions and rewards, and staged a drill to boost their morale. During this time, when a Wei officer Deng Dun (鄧敦) said that Shu could not be conquered, Sima Zhao executed him as a warning to others to not speak ill of the campaign.

Zhong Hui had ordered Xu Yi, a son of the veteran Wei general Xu Chu, to oversee the construction of a road leading into Shu. However, when the road turned out to be poorly built, Zhong Hui disregarded Xu Yi's background and executed him for failing his mission. The Wei army was shocked at Zhong Hui's audacity.

Wei reinforcements
Between 20 October and 17 November 263, Sima Zhao ordered three commandery administrators to lead their garrison forces to join the campaign: Wang Qi to lead troops from Tianshui Commandery to attack Jiang Wei's camp; Qian Hong to lead troops from Longxi Commandery and launch a frontal assault on Jiang Wei's position; and Yang Xin (楊欣) to lead troops from Jincheng Commandery (金城郡; around present-day Yuzhong County, Gansu) to attack Gansong.

Liu Qin (劉欽) also led troops from Weixing Commandery (魏興郡; around present-day Ankang, Shaanxi) to attack Hanzhong Commandery via the Ziwu Valley (子午谷; east of present-day Yang County, Shaanxi).

Shu response to the Wei invasion
Upon receiving news of the Wei invasion, the Shu government ordered Liao Hua to lead reinforcements to support Jiang Wei at Tazhong. At the same time, they also sent Zhang Yi, Dong Jue and others to lead troops to Yang'an Pass (陽安關; a.k.a. Yangping Pass 陽平關; in present-day Ningqiang County, Shaanxi) and assist the Shu forces defending the external perimeter.

When the Shu reinforcements reached Yinping (陰平; present-day Wen County, Gansu), they heard that the Wei army led by Zhuge Xu was attacking Jianwei (建威; northeast of present-day Wudu District, Longnan, Gansu), so they stopped in their tracks at Yinping.

Eastern flank

Lecheng and Hancheng
Around September or October 263, after his army passed through the Xie and Luo valleys as planned, Zhong Hui ordered his subordinates Li Fu and Xun Kai (荀愷) to each lead a detachment of 10,000 troops to attack Lecheng and Hancheng respectively. At the time, Lecheng and Hancheng were respectively guarded by the Shu officers Wang Han (王含) and Jiang Bin, who each commanded 5,000 troops.

During this time, Zhong Hui wrote to Jiang Bin to ask him for the location of the tomb of his father Jiang Wan. Jiang Bin politely obliged and told Zhong Hui that his father's tomb was in Fu County (涪縣; present-day Mianyang, Sichuan). Zhong Hui sent his men to pay respects on his behalf at Zhuge Liang's tomb at Mount Dingjun, and later visited Jiang Wan's tomb when he reached Fu County.

Wang Han and Jiang Bin managed to hold their positions at Lecheng and Hancheng respectively. After failing to capture either of the two fortresses, Zhong Hui led his army to bypass the two fortresses and move on towards Yang'an Pass. While Wang Han's eventual fate is unknown, it is recorded that after the fall of Shu, Jiang Bin surrendered to Zhong Hui at Fu County and befriended him.

Yang'an Pass
While Zhong Hui was supervising the assaults on Lecheng and Hancheng, he ordered Hu Lie to lead the vanguard force to attack Yang'an Pass and seize control of the pass's stockpiles of food supplies and equipment.

The Shu general Fu Qian was in charge of guarding Yang'an Pass. His subordinate, Jiang Shu (蔣舒), previously served as an area commander at Wuxing (武興縣; present-day Lueyang County, Shaanxi). However, due to incompetence, he was removed from his appointment and reassigned to Yang'an Pass. As a result, he bore a grudge against the Shu government and secretly desired to defect to Wei.

Jiang Shu first attempted to persuade Fu Qian to lead his troops out of Yang'an Pass to engage the enemy in battle, but Fu Qian refused as he felt that it was too risky. Jiang Shu then lied to Fu Qian that he would go out to fight the enemy while Fu Qian would remain behind to guard the pass. After Fu Qian agreed, Jiang Shu led the troops out of Yang'an Pass to Yinping, where he surrendered to Hu Lie. Seeing that Yang'an Pass's defences had weakened after Jiang Shu's defection, Hu Lie led his troops to attack the pass and succeeded in capturing it along with its resources. Fu Qian fought bravely to resist the enemy but ultimately lost his life. The Wei soldiers were impressed by his heroism.

Western flank

From Tazhong to Yinping
Around mid-November 263, after one month of battle at Tazhong, Deng Ai defeated Jiang Wei in battle and forced him to retreat towards Yinping. After Jiang Wei received news that Zhong Hui's army had taken Yang'an Pass and occupied Hanzhong, he attempted to retreat to Baishui (白水; in present-day Qingchuan County, Sichuan) but Yang Xin caught up with him and defeated him at Qiangchuankou (彊川口; the intersection of the Bailong and Jialing rivers) near Yinping.

Upon learning that Zhuge Xu had blocked his retreat route at the Wujie Bridge near Yinping, Jiang Wei led his remaining troops through Konghan Valley (孔函谷; south of present-day Xigu District, Lanzhou, Gansu) to the northern road in an attempt to bypass Zhuge Xu's position. When Zhuge Xu heard about it, he retreated back by 30 li. By then, Jiang Wei and his troops had travelled about 30 li on the northern road when they heard that Zhuge Xu had lifted the blockade at the bridge. Jiang Wei ordered his troops to turn back and quickly cross the bridge. Zhuge Xu tried to turn back to block Jiang Wei again but arrived at the bridge one day too late. After crossing the bridge, Jiang Wei moved to the fortified mountain pass Jiange (in present-day Jiange County, Sichuan) and garrisoned there.

Shu defence of Jiange

By the time the Shu reinforcements led by Zhang Yi and Dong Jue reached Hanshou County, Jiang Wei and Liao Hua had decided to abandon their position at Yinping and rendezvous with Zhang Yi and Dong Jue at Jiange.

During this time, Zhong Hui launched several assaults on Jiange but failed to breach the mountain pass's defences. He then wrote a letter to Jiang Wei to persuade him to surrender:  Jiang Wei did not reply to Zhong Hui's letter, and ordered his troops to strengthen their defences at Jiange.

Zhong Hui also wrote a long address to the Shu forces to urge them to surrender: 

When his army's food supplies ran low, Zhong Hui considered giving up on taking Jiange and retreating.

Zhong Hui seizing command of Zhuge Xu's army
When Deng Ai asked Zhuge Xu to join him in taking a detour to bypass Jiange, the latter refused because he was not authorised to. Zhuge Xu then led his army to Baishui to rendezvous with Zhong Hui and join him in attacking Jiang Wei at Jiange. Zhong Hui wanted to seize control of Zhuge Xu's army so he secretly reported to the Wei imperial court that Zhuge Xu showed cowardice during battle. As a result, Zhuge Xu was relieved of his command and sent back to the Wei capital Luoyang in a prison cart.

Deng Ai's detour

When he was at Yinping, Deng Ai came up with the idea of taking a shortcut through Deyang Village to Fu County that would lead them to an area about 100 li west of Jiange and about 300 li from the Shu capital Chengdu. His idea was to lure Jiang Wei to send reinforcements from Jiange to Fu County and weaken Jiange's defences; if Jiang Wei did not send reinforcements, Fu County would be isolated and easily conquered.

Zhong Hui approved Deng Ai's idea and even ordered his subordinate Tian Zhang (田章) to join Deng Ai on the expedition. Some time between 18 November and 17 December 263, Deng Ai led a strike force from Yinping through the shortcut, bypassing the west of Jiange and heading straight towards Jiangyou. The shortcut covered a distance of more than 700 li and cut across mountainous terrain. Deng Ai and his men had to construct several bridges along the way. The mountains were high and the valleys were deep, which made the journey extremely dangerous. After some time, they were completely cut off from their supply train. Deng Ai wrapped himself in a large piece of felt and rolled down the mountain. His men climbed trees and scaled cliffs in single file. Along the way, they encountered three groups of Shu ambushers, defeated them and destroyed their camps. Deng Ai let Tian Zhang lead the vanguard and clear the path. Deng Ai and his vanguard showed up at Jiangyou. Ma Miao (馬邈), the Shu-appointed administrator of Jiangyou, gave up resistance and surrendered to Deng Ai.

Battle of Mianzhu
Following their capture of Jiangyou, Deng Ai and his men pushed on further to Fu County, where they encountered resistance from Shu forces led by Zhuge Zhan. Zhuge Zhan's subordinate, Huang Chong, urged his superior to swiftly take control of the mountainous terrain around Fu County and use that geographical advantage to stop the Wei forces from entering the flat lands. When Zhuge Zhan hesitated, Huang Chong broke down in tears as he repeatedly urged the former to do so.

Zhuge Zhan then ordered his vanguard force to attack Deng Ai at Fu County but they lost the battle. Zhuge Zhan and his remaining troops then retreated to Mianzhu, where he soon received a letter from Deng Ai asking him to surrender. A furious Zhuge Zhan executed the messenger who delivered the letter, and ordered his troops to assemble in formation outside Mianzhu and prepare to engage the enemy in battle.

Deng Ai ordered his son Deng Zhong (鄧忠) and subordinate Shi Zuan (師纂) to each lead a detachment of troops to flank Zhuge Zhan from the right and left respectively. After failing to break the Shu formation, they returned to Deng Ai and told him: "The enemy cannot be defeated." Deng Ai sternly replied: "This battle will determine whether we live or die. What do you mean when you say the enemy cannot be defeated?" When he threatened to execute them for cowardice, they quickly turned back and led their troops to attack again. On their second attempt, they succeeded in breaking the Shu formation and then proceeded to occupy Mianzhu. Zhuge Zhan, along with his son Zhuge Shang and subordinates Huang Chong, Li Qiu and Zhang Zun, were all killed in action at Mianzhu.

Fall of Shu
When Jiang Wei learnt of the fall of Mianzhu, he led his forces east towards Ba Commandery (巴郡; present-day Chongqing). Zhong Hui led his army to Fu County and ordered Hu Lie, Tian Xu, Pang Hui and others to lead troops to pursue Jiang Wei.

Liu Shan's surrender
In the meantime, after capturing Mianzhu, Deng Ai and his men pressed on further to Luo County (雒縣; north of present-day Guanghan, Sichuan) near the Shu capital Chengdu. Around this time, when Liu Shan held a discussion with his subjects on what options they had, some suggested that they flee to their ally state Wu while others proposed retreating southward into the Nanzhong region (covering parts of present-day southern Sichuan, Yunnan and Guizhou).

Liu Shan ultimately heeded Qiao Zhou's suggestion to give up resistance and surrender to Deng Ai. One of Liu Shan's sons, Liu Chen, had strongly advocated making a last stand against Deng Ai. However, after Liu Shan decided to surrender, Liu Chen went to the ancestral temple of his grandfather Liu Bei and cried his heart out. He then killed his wife and children before committing suicide.

Liu Shan wrote a surrender document as follows: 

As instructed, Zhang Shao, Qiao Zhou and Deng Liang brought the surrender document and Liu Shan's imperial seal to Deng Ai at Luo County. Deng Ai was so pleased to receive the surrender document and imperial seal that he reported victory to the Wei government and sent Zhang Shao and Deng Liang back to Chengdu. At the same time, Liu Shan also instructed Zhang Jun (張峻) and others to relay his orders throughout the Shu territories to surrender to Wei, and sent Jiang Xian to order Jiang Wei to surrender to Zhong Hui at Fu County. He then sent Li Hu (李虎) to present to Deng Ai a record book containing demographic and other statistical data about Shu. According to the records, Shu had 280,000 households, a population of 940,000, an army of 120,000, 40,000 officials, over 400,000 hu of grain, 2,000 jin of gold, 2,000 jin of silver, and 400,000 rolls of brocade and coloured silk.

When Deng Ai and his troops arrived at the north gate of Chengdu, Liu Shan tied himself up and brought along a coffin as he led an entourage of over 60 people to officially surrender to Deng Ai. Deng Ai burnt the coffin, freed Liu Shan from his bonds and treated him kindly. Using the acting imperial authority granted to him by the Wei government, Deng Ai appointed Liu Shan as acting General of Chariots of Cavalry (驃騎將軍) and granted other titles to former Shu nobles and officials. He allowed Liu Shan to continue living in his palace and even visited Liu Shan and his family later. At the same time, he forbid his troops from plundering and pillaging Chengdu, and ordered that daily activities in the city resume as per normal. The people of Shu were very impressed with Deng Ai's generosity and kindness; some former Shu officials even became his subordinates.

Deng Ai appointed Shi Zuan as the Inspector of Yi Province and put Qian Hong in charge of overseeing the former Shu commanderies. He also ordered the construction of a memorial at Mianzhu to glorify his victory and had the fallen Wei soldiers buried there alongside their Shu counterparts.

Jiang Wei's surrender
Meanwhile, the Shu forces under Jiang Wei received confusing information about the situation in Chengdu. Some said that Liu Shan wanted to remain in Chengdu and defend the city, while others claimed that the Shu emperor was going to abandon Chengdu and flee south to Jianning Commandery (建寧郡; covering parts of present-day Yunnan and Guizhou). Jiang Wei thus prepared to lead his troops to Qi County (郪縣; present-day Santai County, Sichuan), which was nearer to Chengdu, to verify the truth. Just then, they received orders from Chengdu to lay down their arms and surrender to Zhong Hui at Fu County. Many Shu soldiers felt so shocked and angry when they heard of their emperor's surrender that they drew their swords and slashed at rocks to vent their frustration.

When Zhong Hui finally met Jiang Wei, he asked him: "Why are you late?" With a solemn expression on his face and tears streaming down his cheeks, Jiang Wei replied: "Our meeting today came too early." Zhong Hui was impressed by Jiang Wei's response.

Wu reinforcements
Between 18 November and 17 December 263, the Shu government had made an urgent request for support from their ally state, Wu, in the east. On 8 January 264, the Wu emperor Sun Xiu ordered five officers to lead three separate forces to attack Wei territories in the hope of diverting Wei attention away from Shu: Ding Feng to attack Shouchun (壽春; present-day Shou County, Anhui); Liu Ping and Shi Ji to attack Nan Commandery (南郡; around present-day Jingzhou, Hubei); and Ding Fēng and Sun Yi to attack Wei territories along the middle Mian River. The Wu forces pulled back when they received news of the fall of Shu.

Aftermath

Deng Ai's arrest and downfall

Feeling proud of his achievements, Deng Ai became very arrogant and boastful as he took control of and oversaw the post-war Shu territories. Around February 264, he wrote to Sima Zhao to suggest ideas to conquer Wei's other rival state, Wu. When Sima Zhao told him that his proposal had to be discussed in the imperial court before approval, Deng Ai grew impatient and hinted that he was justified in ignoring standard protocol and behaving autocratically as long as he acted in Wei's interests. Zhong Hui, who secretly desired to rebel against Wei, used the opportunity to exploit and manipulate Deng Ai's arrogance to great effect. After intercepting a report from Deng Ai to the Wei imperial court, he imitated Deng Ai's handwriting and edited the report to make it sound rude and demanding. He also destroyed a letter from Sima Zhao to Deng Ai.

In late February 264, the Wei imperial court ordered Zhong Hui and Wei Guan to arrest Deng Ai, relieve him of his command, and send him back to Luoyang in a prison cart. On or after 3 March 264, Wei Guan sent Tian Xu to lead soldiers to intercept and kill Deng Ai, his son Deng Zhong and subordinate Shi Zuan at the west of Mianzhu.

Zhong Hui's rebellion

After Deng Ai was arrested and taken away, Zhong Hui assumed overall command of the Wei forces occupying former Shu territories. At Jiang Wei's instigation, he decided to start a rebellion against Sima Zhao, and came up with a strategy to attack Luoyang with Jiang Wei's assistance.

On 1 March 264, a day after arriving in Chengdu, Zhong Hui summoned all the high-ranking Wei officers to attend a meeting and showed them a fake imperial decree ordering them to rise up against Sima Zhao and overthrow him. However, he became worried that the officers were unwilling to support him so he instructed his close aides to seize command of the officers' units and detain the officers. On 3 March, when there were rumours that Zhong Hui wanted to purge all the officers who refused to participate in the rebellion, the detained officers broke out of captivity, regrouped with their units, and launched a mutiny against Zhong Hui. Chaos broke out in Chengdu and hundreds of people were killed. Zhong Hui and Jiang Wei fought the mutinying soldiers but were ultimately overwhelmed and killed.

Wu invasion of Badong

During the Wei invasion of Shu, the Shu general Yan Yu (閻宇), who was in charge of guarding Badong Commandery (巴東郡; covering parts of present-day Chongqing), received orders to lead troops from Badong to support the Shu forces at the frontline. Yan Yu's deputy, Luo Xian, remained behind with only 2,000 troops to guard Yong'an (永安; present-day Fengjie County, Chongqing), the capital of Badong Commandery.

In November or December 263, when news of Chengdu's fall reached Yong'an, Luo Xian managed to calm down the people and restore order and stability in Yong'an. After receiving news confirming that Liu Shan had indeed surrendered to Wei, Luo Xian gathered all his troops and mourned the fall of Shu for three days.

In the meantime, Wu prepared to take advantage of the situation to invade Shu and seize control of former Shu territories under the pretext of sending reinforcements to help Shu resist the Wei invaders. Around March 264, the Wu general Bu Xie led troops from Xiling (西陵; present-day Yichang, Hubei) to attack Yong'an but encountered strong resistance from Luo Xian and his men. As the Wu forces rained arrows on his position, Luo Xian ordered his subordinate Yang Zong (楊宗) to break out of the siege and seek help from Wei. He also surrendered his tallies and sent his son as a hostage to convince the Wei regent Sima Zhao of his sincerity. During this time, he led his men to strike back at the Wu forces and defeated them.

Enraged at Bu Xie's defeat, the Wu emperor Sun Xiu ordered his general Lu Kang to lead 30,000 troops to support Bu Xie and besiege Yong'an. After a six-month-long siege, more than half of Yong'an's population fell sick from infectious diseases. Just then, the Wei general Hu Lie led reinforcements from Jing Province to help Luo Xian and lift the siege on Yong'an. The Wu forces retreated upon seeing the arrival of Wei reinforcements. Sima Zhao accepted Luo Xian's surrender and ordered him to remain behind and continue guarding Yong'an.

Order of battle

Wei forces
Grand Chief Controller (大都督) Sima Zhao, the regent of Wei, oversaw the entire campaign from the Wei capital Luoyang.
General Who Guards the West (鎮西將軍) Zhong Hui led an army of over 100,000 to attack Shu from the eastern flank.
Official of Justice (廷尉卿) Wei Guan served as an acting military judge under Zhong Hui. He also received imperial authority to supervise Zhong Hui and Deng Ai's military operations.
Chief Clerk (長史) Du Yu
General of the Vanguard (前將軍) Li Fu (李輔) led a detachment of 10,000 troops to attack Lecheng County.
Army Protector (護軍) Xun Kai (荀愷) led a detachment of 10,000 troops to attack Hancheng County.
Army Protector (護軍) Hu Lie led the vanguard force to attack Yang'an Pass.
 Officer of the Standard (牙門將) Xu Yi oversaw the construction of a road leading into Shu. He was executed for failing his mission when the road turned out to be poorly built.
Tian Zhang (田章) accompanied Deng Ai on his detour through the shortcut to Mianzhu.
General Who Pacifies Bandits (平寇將軍) Pang Hui
Army Protector (護軍) Tian Xu
Inspector of Yong Province (雍州刺史) Zhuge Xu led an army of 30,000 to attack Shu from the central flank.
General Who Attacks the West (征西將軍) Deng Ai led an army of 30,000 to attack Shu from the western flank.
Deng Zhong led the attack on Mianzhu.
Major (司馬) Shi Zuan (師纂), a former registrar under Sima Zhao. He was reassigned to serve in Deng Ai's army. He led the attack on Mianzhu.
Administrator of Weixing (魏興太守) Liu Qin (劉欽) led troops from Weixing Commandery to attack Hanzhong Commandery via the Ziwu Valley.
Administrator of Tianshui (天水太守) Wang Qi led troops from Tianshui Commandery to attack Tazhong.
Administrator of Longxi (隴西太守) Qian Hong led troops from Longxi Commandery to attack Tazhong.
Administrator of Jincheng (金城太守) Yang Xin (楊欣) led troops from Jincheng Commandery to attack Gansong.

Shu forces
 General-in-Chief (大將軍) Jiang Wei led the Shu defences at Tazhong before he retreated to Yinping and then to Jiange.
 Right General of Chariots and Cavalry (右車騎將軍) Liao Hua led reinforcements to support Jiang Wei at Tazhong and Yinping before retreating to Jiange together with him.
 Left General of Chariots and Cavalry (左車騎將軍) Zhang Yi led reinforcements to join Jiang Wei at Jiange.
 Senior General Who Assists the State (輔國大將軍) Dong Jue led reinforcements to join Jiang Wei at Jiange.
 Left General of the Household (左中郎將) Fu Qian guarded Yang'an Pass.
 Jiang Shu (蔣舒) defected to Wei forces and assisted them in capturing Yang'an Pass.
 Army Inspector (監軍) Wang Han (王含) led 5,000 troops to guard Lecheng County.
 General of Pacifying Martial Might (綏武將軍) Jiang Bin led 5,000 troops to guard Hancheng County.
 Administrator of Jiangyou (江油太守) Ma Miao (馬邈) guarded Jiangyou.
 General Who Protects the Army (護軍將軍) Zhuge Zhan guarded Mianzhu.
 Zhuge Shang
 Master of Writing (尚書) Huang Chong
 Master of Writing (尚書) Zhang Zun
 Right Commander of the Yulin Imperial Guards (羽林右部督) Li Qiu
Right General-in-Chief (右大將軍) Yan Yu (閻宇) led reinforcements from Badong Commandery to defend Chengdu.
 Army Commandant (領軍) Luo Xian defended Yong'an County from a Wu invasion after the fall of Shu.
Yang Zong (楊宗) was sent by Luo Xian to seek reinforcements from Wei in defending Yong'an from Wu.

Wu forces
General-in-Chief (大將軍) Ding Feng led Wu forces to attack Shouchun and divert Wei attention away from Shu.
Liu Ping led Wu forces to attack Nan Commandery.
Upper General-in-Chief (上大將軍) Shi Ji led Wu forces to attack Nan Commandery.
General of the Rear (後將軍) Ding Fēng led Wu forces to attack Wei territories along the middle Mian River.
Sun Yi led Wu forces to attack Wei territories along the middle Mian River.
General Who Pacifies the Army (撫軍將軍) Bu Xie led Wu forces to attack Yong'an County after the fall of Shu.
General Who Guards the Army (鎮軍將軍) Lu Kang led 30,000 troops to reinforce Bu Xie.

In popular culture
Mie Shu Ji (滅蜀記; literally: The Tale of the Destruction of Shu) is a 2008 novel by Li Bo (李柏) that dramatises the events leading to the fall of Shu, with Jiang Wei, Deng Ai and Zhong Hui as the central characters.

The Conquest of Shu by Wei is featured as the final stage of the Jin dynasty's campaign in the seventh instalment of Koei Tecmo's Dynasty Warriors video game series.

Notes

References

 Chen, Shou (3rd century). Records of the Three Kingdoms (Sanguozhi).
 Fang, Xuanling (648). Book of Jin (Jin Shu).
 
 Luo, Guanzhong (14th century). Romance of the Three Kingdoms (Sanguo Yanyi).
 Pei, Songzhi (5th century). Annotations to Records of the Three Kingdoms (Sanguozhi zhu).
 
 
 
 

263
Campaigns of the Three Kingdoms
260s conflicts